The 1910 Cornell Big Red football team was an American football team that represented Cornell University during the 1910 college football season.  In their first season under head coach Daniel A. Reed, the Big Red compiled a 5–2–1 record and outscored all opponents by a combined total of 165 to 44. Two Cornell players received honors on the 1910 College Football All-America Team: end Harold Eyrich (Walter Camp–3); and tackle William Munk, Cornell (The Philadelphia Press-2).

Schedule

References

Cornell
Cornell Big Red football seasons
Cornell Big Red football